Johann Eglof von Knöringen (25 July 1537 – 4 June 1575) was Prince-Bishop of Augsburg from 1573 to 1575.

Biography

Johann Eglof von Knöringen was born in Kreßberg on July 25, 1537.  1537 was the same year that the Catholic clergy were expelled from the city of Augsburg.  When he was 13 years old, he was sent to the University of Ingolstadt.  He later studied at the University of Freiburg, where he studied under Heinrich Glarean and Johann Hartung.

In 1553, he received rich benefices in Würzburg, Freising, and Augsburg.  In the 1550s, he traveled widely in Rome, Vienna, northern Germany, and the Seventeen Provinces.

He was ordained as a priest in 1561.  In 1571, Pope Pius V appointed him protonotary apostolic to deal with the dispute with the Jesuits that had led to violence in Augsburg.

He was elected as Prince-Bishop of Augsburg on May 18, 1573, and Pope Gregory XIII confirmed the appointment on July 31, 1573.

He died in Dillingen an der Donau on June 4, 1575 without ever having been consecrated as a bishop.

References

1537 births
1575 deaths
Roman Catholic bishops of Augsburg